Worcester, MA, 4/4/73 is an album by the country rock band the New Riders of the Purple Sage.  It was recorded live at Clark University in Worcester, Massachusetts on April 4, 1973.  It was released on May 20, 2003.  It was the first of a series of albums that were released on the Kufala Recordings label in the 2000s and that contain complete New Riders concerts recorded in the 1970s.

Two members of the Grateful Dead sat in with the New Riders at the Worcester concert.  Keith Godchaux played piano for the entire show, and Donna Jean Godchaux sang lead vocals on the Loretta Lynn song "You Ain't Woman Enough", and backing vocals on the ballad "Long Black Veil".  The New Riders played nineteen original songs and six covers, a total of almost two hours of music.

Recording and sound quality
According to a statement on the back cover, the CD "was mastered directly from the original half track analog reel to reel tapes, recorded at 7.5 ips.  While capturing the band at a fine point in time, the 30-year-old tapes may at certain points exhibit some imperfections due to the ravages of time."

Track listing

Disc one
"I Don't Know You" (John Dawson) – 3:48
"Lochinvar" (Dawson) – 5:06
"Rainbow" (Dawson) – 3:11
"It's Alright With Me" (Dave Torbert) – 3:51
"Sailin'" (Dawson) – 3:01
"Whatcha Gonna Do" (Dawson) – 3:04
"California Day" (Torbert) – 2:53
"Linda" (Dawson) – 3:33
"Groupie" (Torbert) – 2:32
"One Too Many Stories" (Dawson) – 6:07
"Contract" (Torbert) – 3:59
"Teardrops in My Eyes" (Red Allen, Tommy Sutton) – 2:58
"Long Black Veil" (Danny Dill, Marijohn Wilkin) – 4:29
"You Ain't Woman Enough" (Loretta Lynn) – 3:24
"Whiskey" (Dawson) – 3:30

Disc two
"Dirty Business" (Dawson) – 10:08
"Down in the Boondocks" (Joe South) – 3:36
"Hello Mary Lou" (Gene Pitney, Cayet Mangiaracina) – 2:56
"You Should Have Seen Me Runnin'" (Dawson) – 4:42
"Portland Woman" (Dawson) – 6:57
"Henry" (Dawson) – 4:37
"Glendale Train" (Dawson) – 5:24
"Last Lonely Eagle" (Dawson) – 6:19
"Louisiana Lady" (Dawson) – 3:50
"Willie and the Hand Jive" (Johnny Otis) – 11:29

Personnel

New Riders of the Purple Sage
John Dawson – rhythm guitar, vocals
David Nelson – lead guitar, vocals
Dave Torbert – bass guitar, vocals
Buddy Cage – pedal steel guitar
Spencer Dryden – drums, percussion

Additional musicians
Keith Godchaux – piano
Donna Jean Godchaux – lead vocal on "You Ain't Woman Enough", harmony vocal on "Long Black Veil"

Production
Rob Bleetstein – producer
Mike Zasuly – recording
Rich Winter – mastering

Notes

New Riders of the Purple Sage live albums
2003 live albums